The Cymbellaceae are a diatom family in the order Cymbellales.

Genera
General include:
 Alveocymba 
 Brebissonia Grunow, 1860
 Celebesia 
 Cymbella C. Agardh, 1830 
 Cymbellafalsa Lange-Bertalot & Metzeltin, H. Lange-Bertalot & S. Nergui, 2009 
 Cymbopleura (Krammer) Krammer in Lange-Bertalot & Genkal, 1999 
 Delicatophycus 
 Didymosphenia Mart. Schmidt et al., 1899
 Encyonema 
 Encyonopsis 
 Gomphocymbellopsis Krammer, 2003
 Karthickia 
 Khursevichia 
 Kurtkrammeria L. Bahls, 2015
 Navicella Krammer, 1997 
 Navicymbula Krammer, 2003 
 Ochigma 
 Oricymba  Jüttner, Krammer, E.J.Cox, Van de Vijver & Tuji et al., 2010
 Paraplaconeis  Lange-Bertalot & A.Z.Wojtal , 2012
 Placoneis 
 Pseudencyonema 
 Pseudocymbopleura 
 Vladinikolaevia 
 Yasnitskya

References

External links

Cymbellales
Diatom families